Olsenella profusa  is a bacterium from the genus of Olsenella which has been isolated from subgingival plaque in the United States.

References

Further reading 
 

 

Coriobacteriaceae
Bacteria described in 2001